Fuck You All!!!! Caput tuum in ano est is the fifth studio album by Norwegian black metal band Carpathian Forest. It is also their first (and only) release with guitarist Gøran Bomann (a.k.a. "Blood Pervertor") on the band's line-up, and their last one with Tchort — both parted ways with Carpathian Forest in 2014 to form The 3rd Attempt.

Contrasting with the symphonic approach of their previous album, Defending the Throne of Evil, Fuck You All!!!! is a throwback to Carpathian Forest's earlier, rawer musical style, reminiscent of their debut Black Shining Leather.

The album's subtitle is Latin for "Your head is in [your] anus".

Track listing

Personnel
Carpathian Forest
 Roger Rasmussen (Nattefrost) — vocals, guitars, effects
 Terje Vik Schei (Tchort) — guitars
 Anders Kobro — drums, percussion
 Daniel Vrangsinn — bass, effects
 Gøran Bomann (Blood Pervertor) — guitars

Guest musicians
 Ian Tore Narvarsete — backing vocals
 Tom C. Miriam	— backing vocals

Other staff
 Ms. S. Angelcunt — photography, artwork, graphics
 Valle Adžić — mixing
 Vrangsinn — engineering, production

References

Carpathian Forest albums
2006 albums
Season of Mist albums